Aamer Nazir (born 2 January 1971) is a former Pakistani cricketer who played in six Test matches and nine One Day Internationals from 1993 to 1995. He almost achieved the rare feat of a hat-trick on debut but was denied by a poor umpiring decision by West Indian umpire Clyde Cumberbatch.

Career
Nazir received his training from Panthers and Tigers Gymkhana.

When Pakistan played a Test against South Africa in Johannesburg in 1995, injuries to pace bowlers resulted in a call-up for Nazir. Nazir was still on a 14-hour flight when he was named in the team, his plane landed an hour before play and he took the field 35 minutes late. When he bowled, he broke down with cramp.

References

1971 births
Living people
Pakistan One Day International cricketers
Pakistan Test cricketers
Pakistani cricketers
Islamabad cricketers
Allied Bank Limited cricketers
Lahore City cricketers
Cricketers from Lahore